Eurydome , also known as , is a natural satellite of Jupiter. It was discovered concurrently with Hermippe by a team of astronomers from the University of Hawaii led by Scott S. Sheppard in 2001, and given the temporary designation .

Eurydome is about 3 kilometres in diameter, and orbits Jupiter at an average distance of 23,231,000 km in 722.59 days, at an inclination of 149° to the ecliptic (147° to Jupiter's equator), in a retrograde direction and with an eccentricity of 0.3770.

It was named in August 2003 after Eurydome in Greek mythology, who is sometimes described as the mother of the Graces by Zeus (Jupiter).

Eurydome belongs to the Pasiphae group, irregular retrograde moons orbiting Jupiter at distances ranging between 22.8 and 24.1 Gm, and with inclinations ranging between 144.5° and 158.3°.

References

Pasiphae group
Moons of Jupiter
Irregular satellites
Discoveries by Scott S. Sheppard
Astronomical objects discovered in 2001
Moons with a retrograde orbit